Too Much Too Young can refer to:

Too Much Too Young (EP), a 1980 recording by band The Specials/Special A.K.A.
Too Much Too Young: The Gold Collection, a 1996 compilation release by The Specials
"Too Much Too Young", 1992 single by the band Little Angels